"Mes amis, écoutez l'histoire", is a tenor aria in Adolphe Adam's 1836 opera Le postillon de Lonjumeau. The D5 in the final verse is the highest commonly sung note for tenors in opera. Donizetti wrote an E5 for Edgardo in the first act of his opera Lucia di Lammermoor, though it is very seldom sung. Higher notes are occasionally sung in interpolations and ornaments in other bel canto operas, and exceptionally the written F5 at the end of "Credeasi, misera" in Bellini's I puritani.

Famous performers of this aria are Nicolai Gedda, Helge Rosvaenge and Joseph Schmidt, often performing the German version, "Freunde, vernehmet die Geschichte".

Lyrics

References

External links
 
 
, third verse 
 

Tenor arias
Arias in French
1836 compositions
Compositions by Adolphe Adam